Kai Althoff (born 1966 in Cologne) is a German visual artist and musician.

Life and work 
Kai Althoff was born in Cologne, Germany, in February 1966. He is a multimedia artist and a painter. Borrowing from moments of history, religious iconography, and counter-cultural movements, Althoff creates imaginary environments in which paintings, sculpture, drawing, video, and found objects commingle. Tapping a multitude of sources, from Germanic folk traditions to recent popular culture, from medieval and gothic religious imagery to early modern expressionism, Althoff’s characters inhabit imaginary worlds that serve as allegories for human experience and emotion. His image bank and painterly style also draw on the past, especially early-20th-century German Expressionism, reconfigured by introducing collaged technique.

Much of Althoff's work is collaborative. For the 4th Berlin Biennale, Althoff and Lutz Braun created the site-specific installation Kolten Flynn, made up of three vitrines draped in red foil and full of a child’s paintings, drawings, pens and other abandoned materials. Along with Yair Oelbaum, he conceived the dramatic play There we will be buried (2010), which debuted in 2011 at the Dixon Studio in Southend-on-Sea in Essex, England. For their U.S.-premiere performance at the Whitney Museum of American Art, the pair portrayed the show’s main characters, Orpah and Lydia, two single mothers searching for a lost daughter. In Die Kleine Bushaltestelle (Gerüstbau) (Little Bus Stop [Scaffolding], 2012) Althoff performed alongside fellow artist Isa Genzken in a 70-minute absurdist comedy shot on home video.

Althoff's work has been included in several books listing contemporary artists, such as Art Now, published by Taschen. He is also a musician, releasing solo work under such monikers as Fanal, Engelhardt/Seef/Davis Coop. or Ashley's. He and Justus Köhncke perform as Subtle Tease, and he co-founded the band Workshop with Christoph Rath, Stefan Mohr and Stephan Abry.

Althoff is represented by Gladstone Gallery in New York, Galerie NEU in Berlin, and Michael Werner Gallery in London.

Exhibitions
Althoff has been the subject of solo exhibitions worldwide, including Kaiki, an exhibition of artist Kai Althoff’s work selected by Saim Demircan at Focal Point Gallery in Southend-on-Sea in 2011; Kai Althoff  in 2008 at Vancouver Art Gallery;Kai Althoff: Ich meine es auf jeden fall schlecht mit ihnen in 2007 Kunsthalle Zürich; Kai Althoff: Kai kein Respekt (Kai No Respect) in 2004 at Institute of Contemporary Art, Boston and Museum of Contemporary Art, Chicago;  Immo in 2004 at Simultanhalle, Cologne; Kai Althoff and Armin Kraemer in 2002 at Kunstverein Braunschweig, Braunschweig; and Heetz, Nowak, Rehberger in 1997 at Museo de Arte Contemporanea USP, São Paulo. From 18 September 2016 through 22 January 2017, Kai Althoff: and then leave me to the common swifts was on view at the Museum of Modern Art, New York. In 2014, a solo exhibition, Kai Althoff, was presented at Michael Werner Gallery, London.

Current group exhibitions include Invisible Adversaries: the Marieluise Hessel Collection, Center for Curatorial Studies, Hessel Museum of Art, Bard College, Annandale-on-Hudson and Identity Revisited, The Warehouse, Dallas in 2016; Avatar and Atavism: Outside the Avant-Garde, Kunsthalle Düsseldorf, Düsseldorf in 2015; Not Yet Titled, Museum Ludwig, Cologne in 2013.

Selected group exhibitions 

1993: Aperto 93, Venice Biennale, Stand Schafhausen, Venice
1993: E, Künstlerhaus Bethanien, Berlin
1995: Wild Walls, Stedelijk Museum, Amsterdam
1996: Wunderbar, Kunstverein, Hamburg
1997: Time Out, Kunsthalle Nürnberg, Nuremberg
1997: Home Sweet Home, Deichtorhallen, Hamburg
1998: Ars Viva 98/99, Kunstverein Braunschweig, Braunschweig; Brandenburgische Kunstsammlungen, Cottbus; Portikus, Frankfurt
1999: German Open. Gegenwartskunst in Deutschland, Kunstmuseum Wolfsburg, Wolfsburg
2001: Vom Eindruck zum Ausdruck, Grasslin Collection, Deichtorhallen, Hamburg
2001: Neue Welt, Frankfurter Kunstverein, Frankfurt
2002: Drawing Now: Eight Propositions, Museum of Modern Art in New York City
2002: Chère Paintre, Liebe Maler, Dear Painter at the Pompidou Centre in Paris
2003: A Perilous Space at Magnani in London
2003: Lieber Maler, male mir and Schirn Kunsthalle, Frankfurt
2003: Venice Biennale, Museo Correr, Venice
2006: Painting in Tongues at Museum of Contemporary Art, Los Angeles
2006: Heart of Darkness: Kai Althoff, Ellen Gallagher and EdgarCleijne, Thomas Hirschhorn at Walker Art Center, Minneapolis
2007: Make Your Own Life: Artists In & Out of Cologne, Museum of Contemporary Art, Miami
2008: Life on Mars at Carnegie International, Pittsburgh
2009: Between Art and Life: The Painting and Sculpture Collection, San Francisco Museum of Modern Art, San Francisco
2009: Compass in Hand: Selections from the Judith Rothschild Foundation, Museum of Modern Art, New York
2009: Mapping the Studio: Artists from the Francois Pinault Collection, Palazzo Grassi, Venice
2009: Brandon Stosuy and Kai Althoff: Mirror Me, DISPATCH Projects, New York
2010: Beyond | In WNY, Alternating Currents, Albright Knox Triennial, New York
2010: At Home/Not At Home: Works from the Collection of Martin and Rebecca Eisenberg, Bard Center for Curatorial Studies and Hessel Museum of Art, New York
2012: A Bigger Splash: Painting after Performance, Tate, London
2012: The Whitney Biennial, Whitney Museum of American Art, New York

Contributions 
 2008:

References

Bibliography 
 Michael Bracewell, Peter Doig, Romeo Klein and Helena Morell, Kai Althoff: Recent Paintings, Michael Werner (2015), 
 Kai Althoff, Kai Althoff: and then leave me to the common swifts, Museum of Modern Art, New York (2016),

External links 
 Kai Althoff on ArtFacts.Net
 
 Althoff on artnet.com
 Kai Althoff at the Saatchi Gallery
 Kai Atlhoff on Artcyclopedia
 

Living people
German male artists
German male musicians
Artists from Cologne
1966 births
German contemporary artists